The Kitchener Panthers are an independent, minor league baseball team of the Intercounty Baseball League based in Kitchener, Ontario.  They play their home games at Jack Couch Baseball Park. The Panthers used to play at a ballpark in Victoria park before Jack Couch Park was built to replace the old Victoria Park stadium in 1967.

History
The Panthers were a founding member of the Intercounty Baseball League (along with Galt, Guelph and Stratford in 1919). The team changed names when the current league began play in 1957 as the Legionnaires and Dutchmen, but reverted to the current name in 1960.

Championships

Kitchener has won thirteen championships, the second most in the league, behind the Brantford Red Sox with fifteen. 
The Panthers have won in:

Past players

 Bob McKillop -  Chicago White Sox Organization 4-time ICBA MVP  
 Gary Ebel - Oakland Athletics organization
 Ron Smith - San Francisco Giants organization
 Scott Medvin - Pittsburgh Pirates
 Harry Psutka - Detroit Tigers
 Tom McKenzie - Canadian National Team
 Daniel Procopio Houston Astros organization

2021 roster
Accurate as of June 8, 2021

Pitchers:
 Stephen Gade
 Brady Schnarr 	
 Daniel Marquez 
 Matt Stoddart
 Michael Mommersteeg
 Christian Hauck
 Jorden Carthy
 Adam Robertson 
 David Bruinsma
 Liam Devine
 Ryan Douglas
 Jacob Douglas

Catchers:
 Ryley Davenport 
 Noah Murciano
 Nick Parsons 
 Dan Mahoney

Infielders: 
 Stephen Whalen 
 Keegan Marsden 
 Evyn Sherman 
 Elliott Curtis 
 Lucas DiLuca 
 Liam Wilson 
 AJ Karosas

Outfielders: 
 Jett Jarvis 
 Andy Leader 
 Blake Jacklin
 Ethan Baptie
 Jason Kauffeldt
 Carter Arbuthnot

2015 season
The Kitchener Panthers had a great start to the 2015 season, first defeating the Toronto Maple Leafs, followed by a great pitching performance the following week in Barrie, Ontario, defeating the Barrie Baycats. They then went on to defeat the Guelph Royals and Brantford Red Sox. They were in 2nd place after 4 games, going 4-0 only behind the London Majors, who started 7–0.

The Panthers' field was being reconstructed so even though their season started in early May, their home opener wasn't until May 28, 2015. In the home opener they played the Burlington Bandits and lost 8–7. Coach Tebo was ejected from the game for arguing a bad call by the umpire. The next Panthers game was on Friday, May 29, against the Hamilton Cardinals in Hamilton. The Panthers clinched the playoffs 2nd, and they faced the Hamilton Cardinals in the first round in 5 games. The second round went to 7 games against the London Majors. The Panthers won that, so they will play the Barrie Baycats in the finals with game 1 beginning Tuesday, August 25. The Panthers lost the series 4 games to 1 and Barrie won its 2nd straight IBL Championship.

Panthers Hall of Fame
8 Tom Mckenzie 1966-1980 
9 Bob Mckillop 1966-1977 
10 Kevin Curran 1984-1999 
 13 Jeff Pietrazko 1995-2014
22 Randy Curran 1984–90, 95-2003

References

The Kitchener Panthers themselves

https://www.theibl.ca/ibl-2021-signing-tracker

External links
 www.kitchenerpanthers.com
 History of the Panthers

Sport in Kitchener, Ontario
Intercounty Baseball League
Baseball teams established in 1919
Baseball teams in Ontario
1919 establishments in Ontario